Joker is a nickname of the following people:

People with the nickname 
 Joker Arroyo (1927–2015), Filipino lawyer, politician and senator
 Jonas Berggren (born 1967), Swedish musician
 Novak Djokovic (born 1987), Serbian tennis player
 Alex Hall (Australian footballer) (1869–1933), Australian rules footballer
 Nikola Jokić (born 1995), Serbian basketball player
 Jess Liaudin (born 1973), French mixed martial artist
 Joker Phillips (born 1963), American former football player and coach
 Joe Randa (born 1969), American retired Major League Baseball player
 Yong Jun-hyung (born 1989), South Korean pop singer
 Mac Jones (born 1998), American football quarterback

Fictional characters with the nickname 
 Joker, the protagonist in Stanley Kubrick's 1987 film Full Metal Jacket
 Joker (Persona), the protagonist of Persona 5

See also 

Lists of people by nickname